The Ohio and Erie Canal was a canal constructed during the 1820s and early 1830s in Ohio. It connected Akron with the Cuyahoga River near its outlet on Lake Erie in Cleveland, and a few years later, with the Ohio River near Portsmouth. It also had connections to other canal systems in Pennsylvania.

The canal carried freight traffic from 1827 to 1861, when the construction of railroads ended demand.  From 1862 to 1913, the canal served as a water source for industries and towns.  During 1913, much of the canal system was abandoned after important parts were flooded severely.

Most of the surviving portions in the Akron-Cleveland area are managed by the National Park Service or Ohio Department of Natural Resources. They are used for various recreational purposes by the public, and still provide water for some industries. Parts of the canal are preserved, including the Ohio and Erie Canal Historic District, a National Historic Landmark.  Portions further south are less well preserved, and a discontiguous set of locks and other canal resources  roughly between Columbus and the Ohio River are listed on the National Register as the Ohio and Erie Canal Southern Descent Historic District.

History 
Ohio, which achieved statehood during 1803, remained a sparsely populated region of 50,000 people who were scattered throughout the state and who had no means of transporting goods economically out of the state. Without easy access to distant markets, agriculture served only local needs and large-scale manufacturing was nearly non-existent.

Agitation for a canal system (1787–1822)
As early as 1787, George Washington and Thomas Jefferson had discussed the desirability of a canal linking Lake Erie to the Ohio River as part of a national system of canals. It wasn't until 1807 that Ohio's first Senator, Thomas Worthington offered a resolution in Congress asking Treasury Secretary Albert Gallatin to report to the Senate. In 1810, DeWitt Clinton was appointed to manage the Erie Canal Commission. He was unsuccessful in his attempt to get national aid for the construction of a canal connecting Lake Erie to the Hudson River, so he enlisted the aid of state legislators and Ohio's congressional delegation. On January 15, 1812, the Ohio General Assembly passed a resolution expressing its opinion that the connection of the Great Lakes with the Hudson River was a project of "national concern". President Madison was against the proposal, however, and the War of 1812 ended official discussion.

On December 11, 1816, Clinton, by then the Governor of New York, sent a letter to the Ohio Legislature indicating his state's willingness to construct the Erie Canal without national help, and asking the State of Ohio to join the endeavor. On January 9, 1817, the Ohio Legislature directed Ohio's Governor (and former Senator) Thomas Worthington to negotiate a deal with Clinton. Due to the cost, however, the Ohio Legislature dallied, and nothing happened for three years. Finally, in January 1822, the Ohio Legislature passed acts to fund the canal system (and the state's public education obligations).

Survey and design (1822) 
On January 31, 1822, the Ohio Legislature passed a resolution to employ an engineer and appoint commissioners to survey and design the canal system as soon as possible. A sum not to exceed $6,000 was reserved for this purpose.

James Geddes, an engineer who had worked on the New York canals, was hired. Since most of Ohio's population lived along a line from Cleveland to Cincinnati, the main trunk of the canal needed to serve these areas. But no single river followed this line — canals are more cheaply and easily built along river valleys — making it difficult to design a suitable system. Specifically, the bridging of the Scioto and Miami river valleys required raising the canal to such an elevation that water from neither river could be used as a source. As a result, the canal was divided into two sections: the Ohio and Erie Canal, which connected Cleveland to Portsmouth via the Licking Divide and the Scioto River Valley, and the Miami and Erie Canal, which connected Cincinnati to Dayton. This second canal would ultimately be extended to the Maumee River at Toledo.

Copies of the original survey plat maps for the construction of both Ohio canals are available on-line from the Ohio Department of Natural Resources.

Construction (1825–1832) 
On February 4, 1825, the Ohio Legislature passed "An Act to provide for the Internal Improvement of the State of Ohio by Navigable Canals". The Canal Commission was authorized to borrow $400,000 during 1825, and not more than $600,000 per year thereafter. The notes issued were to be redeemable between 1850 and 1875.

On July 4, 1825, ground was broken for the canal at Licking Summit near Newark, Ohio.

These limits were often exceeded, and indeed it was cheaper to do so in most cases. For example, it might be cheaper to build one embankment and then let the water fill all the way to a hillside parallel, perhaps hundreds of feet away, rather than build two embankments. By damming the rivers, long stretches of slackwater could be created which, with the addition of towpaths, could serve as portions of the canal. Where it made economic sense to do so, such as lock widths or portions of the canal through narrow rock or across aqueducts, the minimum widths were adhered to.

Contracts were let for the following tasks: Grubbing and clearing, Mucking and ditching, Embankment and excavation, Locks and culverts, Puddling, and Protection.

Initially, contractors in general proved to be inexperienced and unreliable. It was common for one job to receive 50 bids, many of them local to where the work was being performed. The chosen contractor, having underbid the contract, often would abscond leaving his labor force unpaid and his contract unfulfilled. This problem was so bad that many laborers refused to perform canal work for fear of not being paid. As the bidding process was improved, and more reliable contractors engaged, the situation improved.

Workers were initially paid $0.30 per day and offered a jigger of whiskey. As work progressed, and where labor was in shortage, workers could make as much as $15 per month. At that time, cash money was scarce in Ohio forcing much bartering. Working on the canal was appealing and attracted many farmers from their land.

On July 3, 1827 the first canal boat on the Ohio and Erie Canal left Akron, traveled through 41 locks and over 3 aqueducts along  of canal, to arrive at Cleveland on July 4. While the average speed of  may seem slow, canal boats could carry 10 tons of goods and were much more efficient than wagons over rutted trails.

During the next five years, more and more portions of the canal opened, with it finally being completed during 1832:
 1828 opens from Akron to Massillon, Ohio.
 1829 opens from Massillon to Dover, Ohio.
 1830 opens from Dover to Newark, Ohio.
 1831 opens from Newark to Chillicothe, Ohio.

During 1832, the Ohio and Erie Canal was completed. In addition, there were five feeder canals that added  and 6 additional locks to the system consisting of:
 Tuscarawas Feeder (3.2 miles)
 Walhonding Feeder (1.3 miles)
 Granville Feeder (6.1 miles)
 Muskinghum Side Cut (2.6 miles)
 Columbus Feeder (11.6 miles)

The canal's lock numbering system was oriented from the Lower Basin, near the southwest corner of the current Exchange and Main streets in Akron. North of the basin is Lock 1 North, and south of the basin is Lock 1 South. At this basin was the joining of the Pennsylvania and Ohio Canal.

Operation (1833–1913) 
The canals enjoyed a period of prosperity from the 1830s to the early 1860s, with maximum revenue between 1852 and 1855. During the 1840s, Ohio was the third most prosperous state, owing much of that growth to the canal. Immediately after the Civil War, it became apparent that railroads would take the canal's business. From 1861 until 1879, after the canal had been badly flooded, Ohio leased its canals to private owners who earned revenue from dwindling boat operation and the sale of water to factories and towns. When the state resumed ownership of the canals during 1879, it discovered that they had not been maintained well, and that state lands surrounding the canals had been sold illegally to private owners. In many cases, canals were filled in for "health reasons", with a newly laid railroad track on their right of way. Much state land was given away for free to politically savvy private owners. Nevertheless, some revenue was accrued into the early twentieth century from the sale of water rights as well as recovery and sale of land surrounding the canals.

Abandonment 
After the maximum of the 1850s and a cessation of revenue due to the Civil War during the early 1860s the canal's expenditures started to outgrow its revenues due to increasing maintenance costs.  By 1911, most of the southern portion of the canal had been abandoned.  The Great Dayton Flood of 1913 dumped an abnormally heavy amount of rain on the state, causing extensive flooding. This caused the reservoirs to spill over into the canals, destroying aqueducts, washing out banks, and devastating most of the locks.  In Akron, Lock 1 was dynamited to allow backed up floodwater to flow.

Notable persons associated with the canal 
As a teenager during 1847, James Garfield worked as a "hoggee", driving mules to pull barges along the canal.  After repeatedly falling into the canal on the job Garfield became ill and decided to go to college instead.

The canal presently 

The Ohio and Erie Canal Historic District, a  historic district including part of the canal, was declared a National Historic Landmark during 1966.  It is a four-mile (6 km) section within the village of Valley View comprising three locks, the Tinkers Creek Aqueduct, and two other structures.

A remaining watered section of the Ohio & Erie Canal is located in Summit County, Ohio. The Ohio & Erie Canal is maintained, to this day, as a water supply for local industries. After the flood, a few sections of the canal continued in use hauling cargo to local industries.  Another watered section extends from the Station Road Bridge in Brecksville northwards into Valley View and Independence, all Cleveland suburbs.

The section of the Ohio & Erie Canal from the Brecksville Dam to Rockside Road in Cuyahoga County was transferred to the National Park Service during 1989 as part of the Cuyahoga Valley National Recreational Area (now known as the Cuyahoga Valley National Park).

A lease on the canal lands from the Cuyahoga Valley National Park to the terminus of the canal has been executed with the Cleveland Metroparks. The Metroparks manage the adjacent real estate and the surrounding Ohio & Erie Canal Reservation.

The section of the Ohio & Erie Canal still owned and maintained by the Division of Parks in southern Summit is referred to as the watered section. Included in this section is the feeder canal from the Tuscarawas River and the hydraulics (flood control) at the Portage Lakes.

The Ohio & Erie Canal and its feeder reservoirs are maintained from Akron by a staff of three O.D.N.R. Ohio State Parks, Canal Hydraulic Operators. Like its sister canal, the Ohio & Erie Canal carries a large amount of stormwater. The canals were not designed to accommodate this great influx of stormwater. Most of the siltation and erosion problems experienced presently are the result of stormwater inappropriately piped into the canals over the years.

During late 1996, the canal from Zoar to Cleveland was designated a National Heritage Corridor. This designation was brought about through the efforts of many communities, civic organizations, businesses and individuals working in partnership.

A map showing the disposition of the canal lands is available on-line from the Ohio Department of Natural Resources.

Points of interest

Alexander's (a.k.a. Wilson's) Mill
Richard Howe House (future site)
Boston Store
Canal Visitor Center
Frazee House
St. Helena III Historic Boat Ride in Canal Fulton
Mustill Store
Peninsula Depot
Station Road Bridge
Lock 15 Brewing Co.
Tinkers Creek Aqueduct
 Fort Laurens - Ohio's only American Revolutionary War fort 
Restored canal town Historic Roscoe Village Roscoe Village (Coshocton, Ohio)
Monticello III Canal Ride on Mudport Basin Roscoe Village (Coshocton, Ohio)
Restored Walhonding Aqueduct Bridge Roscoe Village (Coshocton, Ohio)

Connecting canals
The Ohio and Erie Canal initially provided a connection between Akron and Lake Erie at Cleveland, then extending all the way to the Ohio River within a few years.  Later, connecting canal systems were built connecting it with the Pennsylvania and Ohio Canal and other parts of Eastern Ohio.

Towpath Trail landmarks

An all-purpose bicycle/pedestrian trail was constructed by Cuyahoga Valley National Park in Southern Cuyahoga County and Northern Summit County, Cleveland Metroparks in Northern Cuyahoga County, and Akron/Summit County Metroparks in Southern Summit County to roughly follow the original Ohio and Erie Canal Towpath route.  (The northernmost section in Cuyahoga County is still undergoing construction.)  There are many connecting trails going to other points of interest throughout their park systems.

 

Travels through Cuyahoga, Summit, Stark, Licking, Franklin, Fairfield, Pickaway, and Scioto counties.

See also
Ohio & Erie Canalway
Canal Fulton, Ohio
Chesapeake and Ohio Canal
List of canals in the United States
Massillon, Ohio
Miami and Erie Canal
Roscoe Village (Coshocton, Ohio)
Valley View Bridge
Zoar, Ohio

Notes

References

General references 

 National Park Service, United States Department of the Interior

External links 

 Report from the 1872 Inspection of the Ohio & Erie Canal
 Images of the Ohio & Erie Canal at Summit Memory
 Ohio and Erie Canal National Heritage Corridor
 Ohio and Erie Canal Photo Essay
 "Water And Steel, Concrete And Earth", Erin O'Brien, Cleveland Free Times, July 25, 2007
 Pictures around Waverly
 Southern Ohio Museum The Ackerman Collection of Historical Photographs
 Historic Roscoe Village - A restored 1830 Ohio and Erie Canal Town, Triple Locks, Walhonding Aqueduct Bridge, Canal Boat Rides on an original section of the Ohio and Erie Canal
Historic American Engineering Record documentation:

Canals in Ohio
Historic American Engineering Record in Ohio
Ohio River
National Historic Landmarks in Ohio
Economy of Cleveland
National Register of Historic Places in Cuyahoga Valley National Park
Ohio and Erie Canalway National Heritage Area
National Register of Historic Places in Cuyahoga County, Ohio
Canals opened in 1825
Historic districts on the National Register of Historic Places in Ohio
1825 establishments in Ohio
Canals on the National Register of Historic Places in Ohio